Dhaular is a village of Tehsil Talagang, in the Punjab Province, Chakwal District, Pakistan. As of the 1998 census, its total population was about 6,500.

While it is a fertile area, no irrigation system is available in the entire Rawalpindi Division.

Populated places in Chakwal District

References